Hokkons Baules (born June 7, 1948) is a businessman and a politician, and currently a member of the Senate of Palau. He has been the president of the Senate since January 19, 2017. He was elected in 2008 to fill the seat of the late Senate president Johnny Reklai. He had previously served in the Senate of the Second Olbiil Era Kelulau from 1985 until 1988. He received a Bachelor of Arts degree in history from Philippine Union College.

Baules was elected to the Senate of the Seventh Olbiil Era Kelulau in a nationwide special election on May 9, 2007, following the passing of the late Senate president Johnny Reklai. He was the top vote-getter in virtually every state of the republic. Baules was born on June 7, 1948, to Baules Sechelong, a former senator and framer of the Constitution. He graduated from Seventh-day Adventist Elementary School in Koror and went on to graduate from the Palau Mission Academy. He furthered his education at the Philippine Union College, where he received his Bachelor of Arts in history. Baules previously served as a senator in the Second Olbiil Era Kelulau from 1985 to 1988, where he was a chairman of the Committee on Foreign Affairs. He was a member of the 1993 Political Education Commission of the Compact of Free Association, member of the Second Palau Constitutional Convention in 2005, member of the Second Post-Constitution Convention Political Education Committee until he was elected to the Senate, Seventh Olbiil Era Kelulau, and also was the administrative assistant to the Palau Delegation to the Congress of Micronesia. In addition, Baules was an interpreter of the Council of Chiefs during the Micronesian Constitutional Convention, and the worked as status table clerk of the Senate of the former Congress of Micronesia. Baules now serves as chairman of the Senate Committee on Capital Improvement Project, vice chairman of Senate Committee on Resources, Commerce, Trade, and Development; and is a member of Senate standing committees on: Judiciary and Governmental Affairs, Tourism Development, and Ways and Means and Financial Matters.

References

External links
How does Senator Hokkons Baules remain a free man in Palau Society…?

1948 births
Living people
Presidents of the Senate of Palau